Ernst Bergmann may refer to:

Ernst David Bergmann (1903–1975), father of the Israeli nuclear program
Ernst Bergmann (philosopher) (1881–1945), German philosopher and supporter of Nazism
Ernst von Bergmann (1836–1907), German surgeon